Subarnapur, also known as Sonepur, is a town and district headquarters of Subarnapur district of Odisha. The district spreads over an area of 2284.89 km2. It is also known as Second Varanasi of India for its cluster of temples having architectural importance and also of tantricism and second Allahabad for the Meeting Point (Sangam) of two rivers Mahanadi and Tel  in place just like in Allahabad. Subarnapur is also famous for silk, handloom, prawns, terracotta etc.

History
Sonepur was formerly the capital of Sonepur State, a princely state of British India.

Demographics
 India census, Sonepur town had a population of 17,535. Males constitute 53% of the population and females 47%. Sonepur has an average literacy rate of 74%, higher than the national average of 59.5%: male literacy is 82%, and female literacy is 65%. In Sonepur, 11% of the population is under 6 years of age.

Education

 Maharaja High School, Sonepur
 Sonepur College, Sonepur

Temples of Sonepur
 SHREE KAPILESHWAR TAMPLE CHARDA
 MAA CHARDEI TAMPLE CHARDA
 Bhagavati Temple
 Budhima Temple
 Budhi Somalai Temple
 Dadhibaban Temple
 Dasamati Temple
 Gokarneswar Temple
 Gundicha / Nrusimhanath Temple
 Jagannath Temple
  Khambeswari Temple
 Kosaleswara Temple
 Lankeswari Temple
 Narayani Temple
 Paschima Somanath Temple
 Ramachandi Temple
 Rameswar Temple
 Somaleswari Temple
 Sureswari Temple
 Subarnameru Temple
 Balaji (Hanuman) Temple
 ShreeRam (Ramsita)Temple
 Pancharatha Temple

Notable people
 
 Kailash Chandra Meher, painter, awarded Padma Shri by Govt. of India.

Sari
 Sonepuri Sari

Politics
Current MLA from Sonepur (SC) Assembly Constituency is Niranjan Pujari of BJD, who won the seat in State elections in 2014. Previous MLAs from this seat were Binod Patra of INC, who won the seat in 2004, Kunduru Kushal who won this seat representing BJD in 2000, representing JD in 1995 and in 1990, Achyuta Biswal of INC in 1985, Dhaneswar Kumbhar of INC(I) in 1980, and Debraj Seth of JNP in 1977. The place witnessed one and only sitting Prime Minister, i.e. Shri Narendra Modi here on 6th of April 2019.

Sonepur is part of Balangir (Lok Sabha constituency).

See also
 Sonepuri
 History of Sonepur, Odisha

References

 Pasayat, C. and Sudam Naik (2008), Subarnapur Darabari Sahitya (in Oriya), Bhubaneswar: Gyanajuga Publications.
 Pasayat, C. (Ed.) (2008), Paschima Odisara Lokageeta (in Oriya), Bhubaneswar: Folklore Foundation.
 Padhy, S.K.  History and Culture of Sonepur Ph.D. thesis, Berhampur University, 2000 .
Accommodation in Sonepur "HOTEL KASTURI"

Cities and towns in Subarnapur district